Jason E. Bond is a Professor of Entomology and the Schlinger Chair in Insect Systematics at the University of California, Davis. He was previously Professor of Biology, Chair of the Department of Biological Sciences and Director of the Auburn University Museum of Natural History at Auburn University. When he was an associate professor with the Department of Biology at East Carolina University, he discovered the spider Myrmekiaphila neilyoungi and numerous other species in the genus Aptostichus. He went to undergraduate school at Western Carolina University, majoring in biology in 1993. He then went to receive his M.S. in Biology (1995) and Ph.D. in Evolutionary Systematics and Genetics (1999) from Virginia Tech.

On August 6, 2008, Bond appeared on The Colbert Report, where he named the spider Aptostichus stephencolberti after host Stephen Colbert.

See also 

 Entomology
 Arachnology

References

External links 
Jason Bond Faculty page
The Bond Lab

Year of birth missing (living people)
Living people
21st-century American zoologists
East Carolina University faculty
Virginia Tech alumni
Western Carolina University alumni
Auburn University faculty
Arachnologists
American arachnologists
Myriapodologists